Mining in the engineering discipline is the extraction of minerals from underneath, open pit, above or on the ground. Mining engineering is associated with many other disciplines, such as mineral processing, exploration, excavation, geology, and metallurgy, geotechnical engineering and surveying. A mining engineer may manage any phase of mining operations, from exploration and discovery of the mineral resources, through feasibility study, mine design, development of plans, production and operations to mine closure.

With the process of Mineral extraction, some amount of waste and uneconomic material are generated which are the primary source of pollution in the vicinity of mines. Mining activities by their nature cause a disturbance of the natural environment in and around which the minerals are located. Mining engineers must therefore be concerned not only with the production and processing of mineral commodities, but also with the mitigation of damage to the environment both during and after mining as a result of the change in the mining area. Such industries go through stringent laws to control the pollution and damage caused to the environment and are periodically governed by the concerned departments.

History of mining engineering
From prehistoric times to the present, mining has played a significant role in the existence of the human race. Since the beginning of civilization people have used stone and ceramics and, later, metals found on or close to the Earth's surface. These were used to manufacture early tools and weapons. For example, high quality flint found in northern France and southern England were used to set fire and break rock. Flint mines have been found in chalk areas where seams of the stone were followed underground by shafts and galleries. The oldest known mine on archaeological record is the "Lion Cave" in Eswatini. At this site, which radiocarbon dating indicates to be about 43,000 years old, paleolithic humans mined mineral hematite, which contained iron and was ground to produce the red pigment ochre.

The ancient Romans were innovators of mining engineering. They developed large scale mining methods, such as the use of large volumes of water brought to the minehead by numerous aqueducts for hydraulic mining. The exposed rock was then attacked by fire-setting where fires were used to heat the rock, which would be quenched with a stream of water. The thermal shock cracked the rock, enabling it to be removed. In some mines the Romans utilized water-powered machinery such as reverse overshot water-wheels.

Black powder was first used in mining in Banská Štiavnica, Kingdom of Hungary (present-day Slovakia) in 1627.  This allowed blasting of rock and earth to loosen and reveal ore veins, which was much faster than fire-setting. The Industrial Revolution saw further advances in mining technologies, including improved explosives and steam-powered pumps, lifts, and drills as long as they remained safe.

Education

There are many ways to become a Mining Engineer but all include a university or college degree. Primarily, training includes a Bachelor of Engineering (B.Eng. or B.E.), Bachelor of Science (B.Sc. or B.S.), Bachelor of Technology (B.Tech.) or Bachelor of Applied Science (B.A.Sc.) in Mining Engineering. Depending on the country and jurisdiction, to be licensed as a mining engineer a Master's degree; Master of Engineering (M.Eng.), Master of Science (M.Sc or M.S.) or Master of Applied Science (M.A.Sc.) maybe required.
There are also mining engineers who have come from other disciplines e.g. from engineering fields like Mechanical Engineering, Civil Engineering, Electrical Engineering, Geomatics Engineering, Environmental Engineering or from science fields like Geology, Geophysics, Physics, Geomatics, Earth Science, Mathematics, However, this path requires taking a graduate degree such as M.Eng, M.S., M.Sc. or M.A.Sc. in Mining Engineering after graduating from a different quantitative undergraduate program in order to be qualified as a mining engineer.

The fundamental subjects of mining engineering study usually include:
Mathematics; Calculus, Algebra, Differential Equations, Numerical Analysis
Geoscience; Geochemistry, Geophysics, Mineralogy, Geomatics
Mechanics; Rock mechanics, Soil Mechanics, Geomechanics
Thermodynamics; Heat Transfer, Work (thermodynamics), Mass Transfer
Hydrogeology
Fluid Mechanics; Fluid statics, Fluid Dynamics
Geostatistics; Spatial Analysis, Statistics
Control Engineering; Control Theory, Instrumentation
Surface Mining; Open-pit mining
Underground mining (soft rock)
Underground mining (hard rock)
Computing; DATAMINE, MATLAB, Maptek (Vulcan), Golden Software (Surfer), MicroStation, Carlson 
Drilling and blasting
Solid Mechanics; Fracture Mechanics

In the United States, about 14 universities offer a B.S. degree in mining and/or mineral engineering. The top rated universities include Michigan Technological University, South Dakota School of Mines and Technology, Virginia Tech, the University of Kentucky, the University of Arizona,  Pennsylvania State University, and Colorado School of Mines. A complete list can be accessed from smenet.org. Most of these universities offer M.S. and Ph.D. degrees as well.

In Canada, there are 19 undergraduate degree programs in mining engineering or equivalent. McGill University Faculty of Engineering offers both undergraduate (B.Sc.,B.Eng.) and graduate (M.Sc., PhD) degrees in Mining Engineering. and the University of British Columbia in Vancouver offers a Bachelor of Applied Science (B.A.Sc.) in Mining Engineering and also graduate degrees (M.A.Sc. or M.Eng and Ph.D.) in Mining Engineering.

In Europe most programs are integrated (B.S. plus M.S. into one) after the Bologna Process and take 5 years to complete. In Portugal, the University of Porto offers a M.Eng. in Mining and Geo-Environmental Engineering and in Spain the Technical University of Madrid offers degrees in Mining Engineering with tracks in Mining Technology, Mining Operations, Fuels and Explosives, Metallurgy. In the United Kingdom, The Camborne School of Mines offers a wide choice of BEng and MEng degrees in Mining engineering and other Mining related disciplines. This is done through the University of Exeter. In Romania, the University of Petroșani (formerly known as the Petroşani Institute of Mines, or rarely as the Petroşani Institute of Coal) is the only university that offers a degree in Mining Engineering, Mining Surveing or Underground Mining Constructions, albeit after the closure of Jiu Valley coal mines, those degrees had fallen out of interest for most high-school graduates.

In South Africa, leading institutions include the University of Pretoria, offering a 4-year Bachelor of Engineering (B.Eng in Mining Engineering) as well as post-graduate studies in various specialty fields such as rock engineering and numerical modelling, explosives engineering, ventilation engineering, underground mining methods and mine design; and the University of the Witwatersrand offering a 4-year Bachelor of Science in Engineering (B.Sc.(Eng.)) in Mining Engineering as well as graduate programs (M.Sc.(Eng.) and Ph.D.) in Mining Engineering.

Some mining engineers go on to pursue Doctorate degree programs such as Doctor of Philosophy (Ph.D., DPhil), Doctor of Engineering (D.Eng., Eng.D.) these programs involve a very significant original research component and are usually seen as entry points into Academia.

In the Russian Federation, 85 universities in all federal districts are training specialists for the mineral resource sector. 36 universities in all federal districts are training specialists for the extraction and processing of solid minerals (mining). 49 universities in all federal districts are training specialists for the extraction, primary processing, and transportation of liquid and gaseous minerals (oil and gas). 37 universities in all federal districts are training specialists for geological exploration (applied geology, geological exploration). Among the universities that train specialists for the mineral resource sector, 7 are federal universities, 13 are national research universities of Russia. Personnel training for the mineral resource sector in Russian universities is currently carried out in the following main specializations of training (specialist’s degree): “Applied Geology” with the qualification of mining engineer (5 years of training);  “Geological Exploration” with the qualification of mining engineer (5 years of training); “Mining” with the qualification of mining engineer (5.5 years of training); “Physical Processes in Mining or Oil and Gas Production” with the qualification of mining engineer (5.5 years of training); “Oil and Gas Engineering and Technologies” with the qualification of mining engineer (5.5 years of training). Universities develop and implement the main professional educational programs of higher education in the directions and specializations of training, by forming their own profile (name of the program). For example, within the framework of the specialization “Mining”, universities often adhere to the classical names of the programs “Open-pit mining”, “Underground mining of mineral deposits”, “Surveying”, “Mineral enrichment”, “Mining machines”, “Technological safety and mine rescue”, “Mine and underground construction”, “Blasting work”, “Electrification of mining industry”, etc. In the last 10 years, under the influence of various factors, new names of programs have begun to appear, such as: “Mining and geological information systems”, “Mining ecology”, etc. Thus, universities, using their freedom in terms of forming new training programs for specialists, can look to the future and try to foresee new professions of a mining engineer. After the specialist’s degree, you can immediately enroll in postgraduate school (analogue of Doctorate degree programs, 4 years of training).

Salary and statistics
Mining salaries are usually determined by the level of skill required, where the position is, and what kind of organization the engineer is working for. When comparing salaries from one region to another, cost of living and other factors need to be taken into consideration.

Mining engineers in India earn relatively high salaries in comparison to many other professions, with an average salary of $15,250. However, in comparison to mining engineer salaries in other regions, such as Canada, the United States, Australia and the United Kingdom, Indian salaries are low.  In the United States, there are an estimated 6,150 employed mining engineers, with a mean yearly salary of U.S. $103,710.

Pre-mining

Mineral exploration is the process of finding ores (commercially viable concentrations of minerals) to mine. Mineral exploration is a much more intensive, organized, involved, and professional process than mineral prospecting, though it does frequently use the services of prospecting.

The first stage of mining consists of the processes of finding and exploring a mineral deposit. In the following first stage of mineral exploration, geologists and surveyors play a prominent role in the necessary pre-feasibility study of the possible mining operation. Mineral exploration and estimation of the reserve through various prospecting methods are carried out to determine the method and type of mining required in addition to the profitability conditions.

Mineral discovery
Once a mineral discovery has been made, and has been determined to be of sufficient economic quality to mine, mining engineers will then work on developing a plan to mine this effectively and efficiently.

The discovery can be made from the research of mineral maps, academic geological reports or local, state, and national geological reports. Other sources of information include property essays and local word of mouth. Mineral research usually includes the sampling and analysis of sediments, soil and drill-core. Soil sampling and analysis is one of the most popular mineral exploration tools. Common tools include satellite and airborne photographs or airborne geophysics, including magnetometric and gamma-spectrometric maps. Unless the mineral exploration is done on public property, the owners of the property may play a significant role in the exploration process, and might be the original discoverer of the mineral deposit.

Mineral determination
After a prospective mineral is located, the mining geologist and/or mining engineer then determines the ore properties. This may involve a chemical analysis of the ore to determine the composition of the sample. Once the mineral properties are identified, the next step is determining the quantity of the ore. This involves determining the extent of the deposit as well as the purity of the ore. The geologist drills additional core samples to find the limits of the deposit or seam and calculates the quantity of valuable material present in the deposit.

Feasibility study

Once the mineral identification and reserve amount are reasonably determined, the next step is to determine the feasibility of recovering the mineral deposit. A preliminary study shortly after the discovery of the deposit examines the market conditions such as the supply and demand of the mineral, the amount of ore needed to be moved to recover a certain quantity of that mineral as well as analysis of the cost associated with the operation. This pre-feasibility study determines whether the mining project is likely to be profitable; if it is then a more in-depth analysis of the deposit is undertaken. After the full extent of the ore body is known and has been examined by engineers, the feasibility study examines the cost of initial capital investment, methods of extraction, the cost of operation, an estimated length of time to payback, the gross revenue and net profit margin, any possible resale price of the land, the total life of the reserve, the total value of the reserve, investment in future projects, and the property owner or owners' contract. In addition, environmental impact, reclamation, possible legal ramifications and all government permitting are considered. These steps of analysis determine whether the mining company should proceed with the extraction of the minerals or whether the project should be abandoned. The mining company may decide to sell the rights to the reserve to a third party rather than develop it themselves, or the decision to proceed with extraction may be postponed indefinitely until market conditions become favourable.

Mining operation
Mining engineers working in an established mine may work as an engineer for operations improvement, further mineral exploration, and operation capitalization by determining where in the mine to add equipment and personnel. The engineer may also work in supervision and management, or as an equipment and mineral salesperson. In addition to engineering and operations, the mining engineer may work as an environmental, health and safety manager or design engineer.

The act of mining required different methods of extraction depending on the mineralogy, geology, and location of the resources. Characteristics such as mineral hardness, the mineral stratification, and access to that mineral will determine the method of extraction.

Generally, mining is either done from the surface or underground. Mining can also occur with both surface and underground operations taking place on the same reserve. Mining activity varies as to what method is employed to remove the mineral.

Surface mining
Surface mining comprises 90% of the world's mineral tonnage output. Also called open pit mining, surface mining is removing minerals in formations that are at or near the surface. Ore retrieval is done by material removal from the land in its natural state. Surface mining often alters the land characteristics, shape, topography, and geological make-up.

Surface mining involves quarrying which is excavating minerals by means of machinery such as cutting, cleaving, and breaking. Explosives are usually used to facilitate breakage. Hard rocks such as limestone, sand, gravel, and slate are generally quarried into a series of benches.

Strip mining is done on softer minerals such as clays and phosphate are removed through use of mechanical shovels, track dozers, and front end loaders. Softer coal seams can also be extracted this way.

With placer mining, minerals can also be removed from the bottoms of lakes, rivers, streams, and even the ocean by dredge mining. In addition, in-situ mining can be done from the surface using dissolving agents on the ore body and retrieving the ore via pumping. The pumped material is then set to leach for further processing. Hydraulic mining is utilized in forms of water jets to wash away either overburden or the ore itself.

Mining process
 Blasting
 Explosives are used to break up a rock formation and aid in the collection of ore in a process called blasting.  Blasting generally the heat and immense pressure of the detonated explosives to shatter and fracture a rock mass. The type of explosives used in mining are high explosives which vary in composition and performance properties.  The mining engineer is responsible for the selection and proper placement of these explosives, in order to maximize efficiency and safety.  Blasting occurs in many phases of the mining process, such as the development of infrastructure as well as the production of the ore. An alternative to high explosive are Cardox blasting cartridges, invented in 1931, and extensively used from 1932 in coal mines. The cartridge contains an 'energiser' which heats liquid carbon dioxide until it ruptures a bursting disk, there is then a physical explosion of the supercritical fluid.
 Leaching
 Leaching is the loss or extraction of certain materials from a carrier into a liquid (usually, but not always a solvent). Mostly used in rare-earth metals extraction.
 Flotation
 Flotation (also spelled floatation) involves phenomena related to the relative buoyancy of minerals. It is the most widely used metal separating method.
 Electrostatic separation
 Separating minerals by electro-characteristic differences.
 Gravity separation
 Gravity separation is an industrial method of separating two components, either a suspension or dry granular mixture where separating the components with gravity is sufficiently practical.
 Magnetic separation
 Magnetic separation is a process in which magnetically susceptible material is extracted from a mixture using a magnetic force.
 Hydraulic separation
 Hydraulic separation is a process that uses the density difference to separate minerals. Before hydraulic separation, minerals were crushed into uniform size; because minerals have uniform size and different density will have different settling velocities in water, and that can be used to separate target minerals.

Mining health and safety

Legal attention to Mining Health and Safety began in the late 19th century and in the subsequent 20th century progressed to a comprehensive and stringent codification of enforcement and mandatory health and safety regulation. A mining engineer in whatever role they occupy must follow all federal, state, and local mine safety laws.

United States

The United States Congress, through the passage of the Federal Mine Safety and Health Act of 1977, known as the Miner's Act, created the Mine Safety and Health Administration (MSHA) under the US Department of Labor.

This comprehensive Act provides miners with rights against retaliation for reporting violations, consolidated regulation of coal mines with metallic and nonmetallic mines, and created the independent Federal Mine Safety and Health Review Commission to review MSHA's reported violations.

The Act as codified in Code of Federal Regulations § 30 (CFR § 30) covers all miners at an active mine. When a mining engineer works at an active mine he or she is subject to the same rights, violations, mandatory health and safety regulations, and mandatory training as any other worker at the mine. The mining engineer can be legally identified as a "miner."

The Act establishes the rights of miners. The miner may report at any time a hazardous condition and request an inspection. The miners may elect a miners' representative to participate during an inspection, pre-inspection meeting, and post-inspection conference. The miners and miners' representative shall be paid for their time during all inspections and investigations.

Mining and the environment

United States

Land reclamation is regulated for surface and underground mines according to the Surface Mining Control and Reclamation Act of 1977. The law creates as a part of the Department of Interior, the Bureau of Surface Mining (OSM). OSM states on their website, “OSM is charged with balancing the nation’s need for continued domestic coal production with protection of the environment.”

The law requires that states set up their own Reclamation Departments and legislate laws related to reclamation for coal mining operations. The states may impose additional regulations and regulate other minerals in addition to coal for land reclamation.

See also

School of Mines
Underground construction
Mining
Automated mining
Geological Engineering

Footnotes

Further reading

 Eric C. Nystrom, Seeing Underground: Maps, Models, and Mining Engineering in America. Reno, NV: University of Reno Press, 2014.
 Franklin White. Miner with a Heart of Gold: biography of a mineral science and engineering educator. Friesen Press, Victoria. 2020. ISBN 978-1-5255-7765-9 (Hardcover) 978-1-5255-7766-6 (Paperback) 978-1-5255-7767-3 (eBook)

External links
 SME (Society for Mining, Metallurgy and Exploration), publishes the monthly magazine Mining Engineering
 U.S. Department of Labor:  Mining and geological engineers
 British Geological Survey Mineral Processing
 Turkısh Mining Engineers
 Mineral Exploration Properties of Turkey
 DATAMINE (Datamine is a provider of the technology and the services required to seamlessly plan and manage mining operations.) Mining Software
 Mineral Exploration Mapping
 Mining Science and Technologies in Russia

 
Engineering disciplines